Arne Roald Bradstock (aka The "Olympic Picasso") is an Olympic athlete and an Olympic artist from England who competed in the men's javelin throw event during his career. He twice represented Great Britain at the Summer Olympics: 1984 and 1988. In 1992 he was an alternate for the GB Olympic Team and in 1996 was an alternate for the USA Olympic team.  Bradstock competed in the 2000, 2004, 2008 USAT&F Olympic Trials and then, for his 8th and final time at age 50, the 2012 UK Olympic Trials where he came second.

In 2000, Bradstock competed in the United States Olympic Committee (USOC) Sport Art competition in the painting division, for which he won the gold medal.  His winning painting, titled "Struggle for Perfection" then went on to be part of an International exhibition at the International Olympic Committee (IOC) museum in Lausanne as part of the 2000 Sydney Olympics cultural events.

Early life

Bradstock was born on April 24, 1962, in Hertford Heath, Hertfordshire, England. In 1968 he became inspired to become an Olympian as he watched the 1968 Mexico Olympic Games on the BBC.  A few months later he was taken to hospital after he continued to get severe headaches.  His mother, who was a nurse, also noticed his head was growing disproportionately fast to the rest of his body.  He was diagnosed with Spina Bifida and Hydrocephalus ( water on the brain ).  For the next 8 years he was monitored closely and had regular hospital visits to monitor his condition to determine if and when he would need a shunt  put in.  His parents, Basil and Mary, were advised by doctors that he should not play any contact sports, for fear that he could become paralyzed if he was hit in the wrong place.  He was not allowed to play rugby at school.  Instead he took up swimming, power-lifting,  Olympic-lifting and javelin throwing.  He became a competitive school and district level swimmer and a county level weightlifter.  But it was ability to throw a javelin where he really excelled and rapidly rose to a national level.

Despite the medical issues Bradstock was having it did not dampen his love of sports, especially throwing things.  From age 6 he would throw anything and everything from stones and sticks to apples and snowballs which continues on today, even in his late -50s.

Bradstock also had an obsession and passion with art from early on.  In 1967, he began using plasticine as a medium, to create sculptures of animals, people and landscapes and won a local art show at 6 years old.  He also created thousands of plasticine soldiers and created intricate battle scenes on his bedroom floor and then took photographs.

Biography
In 1981 Bradstock, aged 19, threw the senior men's 800 gram javelin 83.20m.  He also won the silver medal at the European Junior Championships behind Uwe Hohn of East Germany.  He finished that year being ranked number two in the World Junior rankings, again behind Uwe Hohn of East Germany.

In 1985 he became the first British Javelin thrower to break the 90-meter barrier with the "Old Rule" javelin with a Commonwealth Record of 91.40m / 299 ft 10".  The following year, in 1986, he became the first man in the world to surpass the 80m barrier with the "New Rule" javelin with a World Record Throw of 81.74m.  In 1987 he improved on his mark with a throw of 83.84m / 275 ft 1".

In addition to being an Olympic athlete, Bradstock is also an Olympic artist dubbed "The Olympic Picasso".

In 2000 he won the United States Olympic Committee ( [USOC] ) Sport Art Competition.  His winning artwork was exhibited at the International Olympic Museum in Lausanne as part of the cultural activities leading up to the 2000 Sydney Olympic Games.

In 2003 Bradstock won the prestigious International Sports Artist of the Year.  This award was given by the United States Sport Academy (USSA) and American Sport Museum and Archives (ASAMA) in recognition of Bradstock unique award-winning style of art called "athletic abstraction".

In early 2006 he became a founding member of an Olympic revival movement called Art of the Olympians.

In late 2006, after the BBC heard of an ambitious proposal Bradstock had for the 2012 London Organizing Committee of the Olympic Games ( [LOCOG] ) which would combine Sport and Art in a revolutionary way and scale, he became nicknamed "The Olympic Picasso".

In December 2007 Bradstock began posting athletic and artistic videos on YouTube at "roald62".  The videos range from the serious to the humorous. He is seen competing breaking national, international and world records in the javelin throw.  He can also be seen throwing everything and anything from a dead fish on a beach across the Alabama / Florida State line to throwing a kitchen sink as part of a "Random objects throwing competition" that was held on an airport runway in England as part of a UK television series on Channel Four called the McCain Track and Field Show.

Some of Bradstock's throwing feats include:  Throwing a vinyl records 112.10 meters, a golf ball 170 yards, a cell phone 132 yards, a soccer ball 82 yards and throwing an iPod classic 154 yards.

In 2008 Bradstock competed in his 7th Olympic Trials ( 4 UK Olympic Trials, 3 US Olympic Trials ).  At age 46 he was the oldest competitor at the 2008 USATF Olympic Trials.  Bradstock received international media attention while competing at the trials on 4 July 2008 but not for his age.  He took three throws, wearing different, brightly coloured, hand painted outfits each time.  He also threw three different hand painted javelins – each one matching a corresponding outfit.

In May 2009 Bradstock threw a World Age (47) Javelin Record of 72.49m.

In October 2009 the IAAF granted Bradstock a change in "Status" allowing him to compete again for his native country of Great Britain.

Throughout the 2010 competitive season he broke 26 UK National age and age group records and set 3 World Age Records for a 48-year-old: 70.16m, 70.40m and 71.07m.  He finished in 8th place at the 2010 UK Trials and the following week won the 2010 UK Masters Championships smashing the meet record with all 6 throws.

In June 2010 Bradstock's artistic accomplishments were recognized in a new international contemporary Sport Art book written by the American Sport Museum and Archives (ASAMA).  The chapter on Bradstock is titled, "The Olympic Picasso".

On 8 January 2011 Bradstock threw  in a competition in Clermont, Florida.  This throw broke the 12-year-old UK Masters Record and broke his own World Age (48) Record.  

On 30 April 2011 in Radford, Virginia, he set a World Age (49) record of 70 m.  Three weeks later in Tucson, Arizona on 19 May, he broke his UK Masters Record 3 more times and set 3 New World Age (49) records, too.  His throws, measuring 72.32 m, 72.87 m and then 74.73 m pushed him up to number 3 on the 2011 UK Rankings—at that time.  It also qualified him for his 8th Olympic Trials in 2012 when he would be 50 years old.

In the Spring of 2010 Bradstock was appointed Legacy Ambassador in the UK for the Youth Sport Trust's 2012 Sports Colleges Legacy Program.  This appointment came after working with the Youth Sport Trust for 2 years.  During that time he gave lectures and workshops at dozens of Sports Colleges around England on the connection between Sport and Art.

On 2 June 2012 in Clermont, Florida Bradstock competed in his first competition as a 50-year-old.  The result: He smashed the M50 World Age Group Record with a 700 javelin by over 5 metres with a throw of 76.15m. The previous record was 71.01m thrown in 2007.

Three weeks later on 23 June 2012 Roald Bradstock threw in his 8th Olympic Trials in Birmingham, England. His first throw was another M50 World Age Group Record this time with an 800g javelin.  His throw of 72.78m was over a 7-meter improvement on the existing World Record. The previous record was 65.76m held by Larry Stuart in 1988.  Bradstock's throw won him a silver medal at the trials where he was not only the oldest athlete in any event but became the oldest medalist in any event in 76 years since 1936.

In late November, 2015 Bradstock became the Executive Director of the Art of the Olympians (AOTO) and the Al Oerter Foundation (AOF).

In March 2016, the ten year anniversary of AOTO, Bradstock launched a global campaign and search to find new Olympian and Paralympian artists to join the organization.  He first made the announcement on BBC Radio Two and then on CNN's World Sport.

On April 25, 2017, International Olympic Committee President (IOC), Thomas Bach, appointed Bradstock to the Olympic Culture and Heritage Commission.

On May 6, 2017, Bradstock competed for the first time in 5 years and broke the British M55 Masters Javelin Record of 55.10m with 3 throws: 59.61m, 61.99m and 62.88m.  The Following week on May 13, in Clermont, Florida he broke his own M55 British Masters Record 3 more times with throws of 63.31m, 64.95m and 66.76m.  His throw of 66.76m also broke the Masters World M55 Javelin Record. List of world records in masters athletics#Javelin throw

In February 2018, Bradstock became part of Olympic history when he participated in the first ever Olympic Art Project during the 2018 Winter Olympic Games in PyeongChang, South Korea. He was one of 4 Olympian artists that took part in the Olympic Artist in Residence project that had 2 components: #1 Creating a series of short films. #2 Creating a series of paintings. Both projects were about Olympians created by Olympians for Olympians. Greek Olympic long-distance runner Alexi Pappas created a series of short films. Jean Blaise Evequoz - 1976 Olympic Bronze medalist in fencing from Switzerland - Lanny Barnes - 5 time American Winter Olympian in the Biathlon assisted Bradstock in the painting project where he was lead artist and instigator.

A total of 15 paintings were created during the 2018 Olympic Art painting project - one painting for each of the 15 sports at the Winter Olympic Games. When the paintings were arranged in 3 rows of 5 they created a larger painting revealing the Olympic rings. A total of 111 Olympians from 39 countries took part in creating the painting(s) including such notable Olympians as IOC President Thomas Bach, World Olympians Association (WOA) President Joel Bouzou and Prince Albert II of Monaco. Diane and Alexandra de Navacelle de Coubertin, family members of the founder of the modern Olympic Games - Baron Pierre de Coubertin - also helped with this historic and World Record breaking project.

On September 12, 2018, The World Olympians Association (WOA) announced the formation of a new WOA Arts Committee. Roald Bradstock OLY was appointed the chair.  Fellow AOTO artists Emanuela Pierantozzi OLY and Shane Gould OLY joined Bradstock on the Arts Committee along with WOA President Joël Bouzou OLY, WOA Executive Committee Member Natalie Cook OLY and Olympian artists Pat Burgener OLY (musician) and Takahiro Fujimoto OLY (actor). Diane de Coubertin - granddaughter of Pierre de Coubertin, founder of the modern Olympic Games - and Francis Gabet, Director of the Olympic Foundation for Culture and Heritage were the final two non-Olympian Committee members.

On the same day ( September 12, 2018) Bradstock also won the (M55) Javelin at the World Masters Championships, in Malaga, Spain. He won with the very last throw of competition with a distance of 61.72m. Among the 37 javelin throwers he beat were Danis Kula, 1980 Olympic Champion.
 
On May 5, 2019, in Clermont, Florida Bradstock broke the World Age (57) Record twice with throws of 63.08m and then 63.88m. His performance also moved him to #1 on the 2019 World Masters M55 Rankings - over 14 meters further then the #2 ranked athlete.

The following month in Kolkata, India at the St Lawrence Boys School's Olympic Day celebrations, called "Expression 2019", Bradstock was joined by Diane de Navacelle de Coubertin and set a World Selfie Record of 192 Selfies in just 3 minutes with the schools children. The World Record marked the beginning of a new project Bradstock was working on called "Olympic Selfie".

On June 24, 2021, the IOC announced the inaugural Olympic Agora that would take place in Tokyo during the Tokyo 2020 Olympic Games. Bradstock was one of 6 athlete artists - 5 Olympians and 1 Paralympian - selected by the Olympic Foundation for Culture and Heritage (OFCH) to be a part of the first ever virtual Olympian Artist-in-Residence Exhibition and Programme and create original works for a unique and historic exhibition in Tokyo. The other participants included Ciara Michel (Great Britain, Volleyball, London 2012); Slaven Dizdarević (Slovak Republic, Track and Field, Beijing 2008); Kelly Salchow MacArthur (USA, Rowing, Sydney 2000 and Athens 2004); Gregory Burns (USA, Swimming, Barcelona 1992, Atlanta 1996 and Sydney 2000); and Hannah Wilkinson (New Zealand, Football, London 2012 and Rio 2016). Bradstock is quoted in the IOC press release saying: “All my life I have been an artist and an athlete—two seemingly polar opposite pursuits. Then 25 years ago, I realized that sport and art are far more similar than they are different.  When I came to this realization, everything changed for me. It changed my approach to my sports training and how and what I created in my art studio.”  
As no foreign spectators were allowed to attend the Tokyo 2020 Olympic Games due to the COVID-19 global pandemic the IOC and OFCH created the Olympic Agora website with virtual Tours of the Olympian Artist-in-Residence Noren Curtains Exhibition so a global audience could see each artists work. 
Bradstock's participation in the Tokyo 2020 Exhibition also made Olympic history, as he became the first ever 3-time Olympic Artist - the first two being in 2000 and 2018.

The "Olympic Picasso"

History 
The "Olympic Picasso" is a nickname given by the media to Bradstock.  In 2000 he won the gold medal in painting in the United States Olympic Committee (USOC) Sport Art competition held by the United States Sports Academy (USSA) and American Sport Art Museum and Archives (ASAMA).  His winning painting titled "Struggle for Perfection" went on to be exhibited at the International Olympic Committee's (IOC) Museum in Lausanne, Switzerland as part of the cultural events and activities leading up to the 2000 Sydney Olympic Games.

Timeline 

In 2006, the phrase the "Olympic Picasso" was first seen in print in the October issue of a British athletics magazine called Athletics Weekly (AW).  The article, about an ambitious Olympic Art proposal that Bradstock was pitching to the 2012 London Organizing Committee of the Olympic Games (LOCOG), referenced renowned BBC sport commentator Paul Dickenson and his nickname for Roald Bradstock.

In 2008 Roald Bradstock competed in his 7th Olympic Trials in Eugene, Oregon.  He created a media frenzy when he stepped onto the javelin runway to take his first throw in the qualifying rounds of the 2008 US Olympic Trials on July 4. He took a total of three throws wearing different hand-painted outfits with matching hand-painted "optical" javelins each time.  His first outfit was a black-and-white-striped zebra-looking costume.  His second was an Olympic-themed kit with all five colors of the Olympic rings painted on it, and his final "number" was a red, white and blue outfit that he said later was to celebrate July 4, America's independence day.

Bradstock's antics on the field got national and international coverage.   In a news conference immediately after the event where he placed 16th, he was besieged by reporters.  Competing in his 7th Olympic Trials and being the oldest person at the Olympic Trials at the age of 46 was of little interest, but what was of interest was his "eccentric" media stunt, his hand painted outfits, his bizarre YouTube videos documenting a long list of World Records for throwing strange objects from dead fish to iPhones, to the BBC's nickname for him.

Over the next four years leading up to Bradstock's historic 8th Olympics Trials, this time for the UK, Bradstock received a lot of press coverage on the radio, TV, newspapers and magazines around the world.  He was also featured in a documentary hosted by 1968 Olympic Figure Skating Champion Peggy Fleming on the Art of The Olympians organization which was founded by 4 time consecutive Olympics Discus Champion and Olympic Icon Al Oerter.

At the 2012 British Olympic Trials, in Birmingham, England Bradstock once again pulled a "media stunt" as he wore a variety of hand painted hats, sleeves, tights, socks and shoes during the competition that he changed between each throw for different looks. He came second with a World Age Record for a 50 year old with a throw of 72.78m and became the oldest person to win a medal in 86 years.

Bradstock still competes in Masters competitions but is now pursuing his art career full-time.

Bradstock is also a founding member of the Art of the Olympians organization that was founded by Olympic Icon and four-time consecutive Olympic discus champion, Al Oerter.

In March 2016, CNN's sports anchor Patrick Snell did an interview with Bradstock titled, " Olympic Picasso" links art and sport.

On Olympic day - June 23, 2017 - the Olympic Channel covered the inaugural Sport and Art competition, called "Expression2017",  held at St Lawrence High School, Kolkata, India. Bradstock was the event's global Ambassador.

In February 2018, Bradstock was introduced to all the IOC members at the 132nd IOC Session in PyeongChang, South Korea at the 2018 Winter Olympic Games as the "Olympic Picasso" by Olympic Museum Director Francis Gabet. He then spoke for 5 minutes about the first ever Olympic Art project called "#OlympicArt" that he developed and was going to implement in the coastal Olympic athletes village in Gangneung throughout the 17 days of the 2018 Winter Olympic Games.

Achievements

Seasonal bests by year
1973 - 27.00 (old-rule 600g) 
1978 - 56.06 (old-rule 800g)
1979 - 66.06 (old-rule 800g)
1980 - 72.72 (old-rule 800g)
1981 - 83.20 (old-rule 800g)
1982 - 78.88 (old-rule 800g)
1983 - 85.32 (old-rule 800g)
1984 - 88.28 (old-rule 800g / GB Record)
1985 - 91.40 (old-rule 800g / GB Record )
1986 - 81.74 ( New-Rule 800g / World Record)
1987 - 83.84
1988 - 75.96
1997 - 74.92
2000 - 76.96
2002 - 71.97
2003 - 74.02
2004 - 74.28
2005 - 68.81
2006 - 70.85
2007 - 72.02
2008 - 67.17
2009 - 72.49
2010 - 71.07
2011 - 74.73
2012 - 72.78 ( 76.16m 700g World Masters Record M50 )
2017 - 66.76 ( 700g / World M55 Masters Record )
2018 - 61.72 ( 700g / M55 Masters World Champion )
2019 - 63.88m ( 700g / World Age (57) Record)

References 

1962 births
Living people
People from Hertford
English male javelin throwers
Olympic athletes of Great Britain
Athletes (track and field) at the 1984 Summer Olympics
Athletes (track and field) at the 1988 Summer Olympics
World Athletics Championships athletes for Great Britain
British masters athletes
World record holders in masters athletics